Kingfish is the self-titled first album by the rock band Kingfish. It was recorded and released in 1976.

When they recorded their debut album, the lineup of Kingfish included Grateful Dead rhythm guitarist Bob Weir. Weir was a member of the band from 1974 to 1976, and left the group shortly after the album's release. Kingfish includes "Lazy Lightnin'" and "Supplication", a jazzy song combination sung by Weir that quickly found its way into the Grateful Dead repertoire.

Besides Weir, Kingfish features original band members Matthew Kelly on guitar and harmonica, Dave Torbert on bass, Robbie Hoddinott on guitar, and Chris Herold on drums.

Track listing

Credits

Kingfish
Bob Weir – guitar, vocals, lead vocals on "Lazy Lightnin'", "Supplication", "Home to Dixie", "Big Iron" & "Bye and Bye"
Matthew Kelly – guitar, harmonica, vocals
Dave Torbert – bass, vocals
Robby Hoddinott – lead guitar, slide guitar
Chris Herold – drums, percussion

Additional personnel
Steve Evans – bass
Barry Flast – piano, vocals
Pablo Green – percussion on track 10
Anna Rizzo – vocals
Jim Sanchez – drums
J.D. Sharp – string symphonizer on tracks 1, 9, and 10

Production
Producer – Dan Healy, Bob Weir
Production assistants – Richard Hundgren, Dean Layman
Arrangement – Kingfish
Recording – Dan Healy, Kingfish
Engineer – Rob Taylor
Mastering – George Horn
Cover painting – Philip Garris
Trident logo – James A. Nelson III
Photography – Bob Marks

Notes

Kingfish (band) albums
1976 debut albums
Albums produced by Dan Healy (soundman)